Johann Friedrich Wilhelm Krause (12 July 1833 – 4 February 1910) was a German anatomist born in Hanover. He was the son of anatomist Karl Friedrich Theodor Krause (1797-1868).

Krause studied at Göttingen, where he became member of Burschenschaft Hannovera (fraternity). In 1854 he earned his medical doctorate, and later (1860) became an associate professor at the University of Göttingen. In 1892 he was appointed head of the Anatomical Institute Laboratory in Berlin.

Krause is known for the discovery and description of mechanoreceptors that were to become known as "Krause's corpuscles", sometimes referred to as "Krause's end-bulbs". His name is also associated with:
 "Krause's membranes": defined as isotropic bands in striated muscle fiber that consist of disks of sarcoplasm and connect the individual fibrils. Also known as Z-Disc or Dobie's line.
 "Krause respiratory bundle": a fiber bundle that is also known as the "solitary tract". Sometimes referred to as "Gierke respiratory bundle", named in honor of anatomist Hans Paul Bernhard Gierke.

Krause is also remembered for pioneer research in the field of embryology. Among his better known students at Göttingen was bacteriologist Robert Koch (1843-1910). Krause is credited with the publication of over 100 medical articles.

Written Works 
 Die terminalen Körperchen der einfach sensiblen Nerven. Hannover, (Treatise on Krause's corpuscles), 1860
 Anatomische Untersuchungen, 1861.
 Die Trichinenkrankheit und ihre Verhütung 
 Uber die Nervenendigung in der Geschlectsorganen, 1866.
 Ueber die Allantois des Menschen, 1875.
 Handbuch der menschlichen Anatomie. (Third edition of his father's work) 3 volumes; Hanover, 1876, 1879, 1880.
 Die Anatomie des Kaninchens, publisher: Leipzig: Engelmann, 1884.

References
 Wilhelm Krause @ Who Named It

1833 births
1910 deaths
Academic staff of the University of Göttingen
German anatomists
Physicians from Hanover
People from the Kingdom of Hanover